Dashu is a town under the administration of Dachuan District, Dazhou, Sichuan, China. , it has one residential community and 16 villages under its administration.

See also 
 List of township-level divisions of Sichuan

References 

Towns in Sichuan
Dazhou